13963 Euphrates, provisional designation , is a resonant Griqua asteroid from the outer region of the asteroid belt, approximately 9 kilometers in diameter. It was discovered on 3 August 1991, by Belgian astronomer Eric Elst at ESO's La Silla Observatory site in Chile. The asteroid was named after the Euphrates River in the Middle East.

Orbit and classification 

Euphrates is one of very few bodies located in the 2:1 mean motion resonance with the gas giant Jupiter and belongs to the "marginally unstable" Griqua group.

It orbits the Sun in the outer main-belt at a distance of 2.5–4.2 AU once every 6 years and 1 month (2,220 days). Its orbit has an eccentricity of 0.26 and an inclination of 1° with respect to the ecliptic. A first precovery was taken at Palomar Observatory in 1971, extending the asteroid's observation arc by 20 years prior to its official discovery observation.

Physical characteristics 

Based on an absolute magnitude of 13.9, it measures between 4 and 10 kilometers in diameter, assuming an albedo in the range of 0.05 to 0.25. Since asteroids in the outer main-belt are mostly of a carbonaceous rather than of a silicaceous composition, with low albedos, typically around 0.06, its diameter is likely to be between 8 and 10 kilometers.

As of 2017, Euphrates effective size, its composition and albedo, as well as its rotation period and shape remain unknown.

Naming 

This minor planet was named after the Euphrates river, that flows through northern Syria and Iraq.

It is one of the most historically important rivers of Western Asia. The Tigris–Euphrates river system, a major river system, is formed when the two rivers combine at Al Qurnah. The minor planet 13096 Tigris is named after the other river of this system. The approved naming citation was published by the Minor Planet Center on 6 August 2003.

References

External links 
 (13963) Euphrates at AstDyS, University of Pisa
 Asteroid Lightcurve Database (LCDB), query form (info )
 Dictionary of Minor Planet Names, Google books
 Asteroids and comets rotation curves, CdR – Observatoire de Genève, Raoul Behrend
 Discovery Circumstances: Numbered Minor Planets (10001)-(15000) – Minor Planet Center
 
 

013963
Discoveries by Eric Walter Elst
Named minor planets
19910803